A referendum on becoming an overseas Territory was held in Mayotte on 11 April 1976, after the proposal of remaining part of the Comoros was rejected in a referendum in February. The proposal was rejected by 97.46% of voters, with almost 14,000 of the 17,384 votes being cast as invalid.

Results

References

1976 referendums
Referendums in Mayotte
1976 in Mayotte
April 1976 events in Africa